Declan David Glass (born 7 June 2000) is a Scottish footballer who plays as a midfielder for Cove Rangers, on loan from Dundee United. 
He made his senior debut for Dundee United in October 2017, and has also played on loan for Airdrieonians, Partick Thistle, Kilmarnock and Derry City.

Early life
Glass was born in Edinburgh on 7 June 2000 and grew up in Tranent, East Lothian, where he attended St Martin's Roman Catholic Primary School and Ross High School. He played youth football for Edinburgh-based Hutchison Vale Boys Club before joining Dundee United as a youth player in 2015.

Club career

Dundee United
Glass signed professionally for Dundee United prior to the 2017–18 season. He made his first team debut as a last-minute substitute in a 2–0 Scottish Championship win at Dumbarton in October 2017.

Glass was loaned to League One team Airdrieonians in January 2019. In July 2019 he went on loan again, joining Cove Rangers in League Two until the following January. Glass joined Scottish League One side Partick Thistle in a loan deal on 24 September 2020. This deal was scheduled to last for the rest of the 2019/20 season, but was curtailed after Glass suffered a knee injury.

Glass was loaned to Kilmarnock in February 2022.

On 29 July 2022, Glass signed for League of Ireland Premier Division club Derry City on a year long loan. He made his debut for the club the following day, scoring a first half hat-trick in a 7–0 win over non-league side Oliver Bond Celtic in an FAI Cup first round tie.

On 6 January 2023, Glass rejoined Cove Rangers, now two divisions higher in the Scottish Championship, until the end of the season.

International career
Glass was called up to the Scotland under-18 schoolboys squad in December 2016 for the Centenary Shield tournament.

Career statistics

References

External links

Living people
2000 births
Footballers from Edinburgh
People from Tranent
Scottish footballers
People educated at Ross High School, Tranent
Association football midfielders
Dundee United F.C. players
Scottish Professional Football League players
Airdrieonians F.C. players
Cove Rangers F.C. players
Partick Thistle F.C. players
Kilmarnock F.C. players
Derry City F.C. players
League of Ireland players
Expatriate association footballers in the Republic of Ireland